Macomia is a city located in the Cabo Delgado Province in northern Mozambique. It is the seat of the eponymous Macomia District.

References

Populated places in Cabo Delgado Province